"Bad Intentions" is a single by American rapper Dr. Dre, featuring vocals from fellow rapper Knoc-turn'al, recorded for and taken from the soundtrack to the film The Wash. The song was produced by Mahogany Music and co-produced by Dre himself. It contains a sample from "Hollywood Hot" by Eleventh Hour. The single was released on 7 January 2002. The song debuted on the UK Singles Chart at number four, staying in the charts for sixteen weeks. The music video for "Bad Intentions" depicts Dr. Dre and Knoc-turn'al filming a fictional music video at a burlesque house named "Bad Intentions". Rapper Jay-Z also used the beat as a diss towards fellow rapper Nas during their feud. The video features a cameo appearance from comedian Tommy Davidson

Track listing
 CD single
 "Bad Intentions" - 3:02
 "The Watcher" - 3:28	
 "The Next Episode" (featuring Snoop Dogg) - 2:42 	
 "Bad Intentions" (Music Video)

 German CD single
 "Bad Intentions" - 3:02
 "Bad Intentions" (Instrumental) - 3:01
 "The Watcher" - 3:28	
 "Bad Intentions" (Music Video)

 12" vinyl
 "Bad Intentions" (Clean Version) - 3:02  	
 "Bad Intentions" (LP Version) - 3:02 	
 "Bad Intentions" (Instrumental) - 3:01
 "Bad Intentions" (Acapella) - 3:01

Charts

References

Dr. Dre songs
Songs written by Knoc-turn'al
Song recordings produced by Dr. Dre
Aftermath Entertainment singles
Interscope Records singles
2002 singles